Granite Peak is a  elevation summit located  northeast of Palmer in the southern Talkeetna Mountains of the U.S. state of Alaska. This landmark of the Matanuska Valley is set midway between Palmer and Chickaloon, with the Glenn Highway traversing the southern base of this mountain. The mountain's descriptive local name was reported in 1946 by U.S. Geological Survey, and officially adopted that same year by the U.S. Board on Geographic Names. This mountain is called Hdighilen Dghilaaye' in the Ahtna language.

Climate

Based on the Köppen climate classification, Granite Peak is located in a subarctic climate zone with long, cold, snowy winters, and mild summers. Temperatures can drop below −20 °C with wind chill factors below −30 °C. The months May through June offer the most favorable weather for climbing or viewing. Precipitation runoff from the mountain drains into Eska and Granite Creeks, both of which are tributaries of the Matanuska River.

See also

Matanuska Formation
Geography of Alaska

References

External links
 Weather forecast: Granite Peak

Mountains of Alaska
Landforms of Matanuska-Susitna Borough, Alaska
Mountains of Matanuska-Susitna Borough, Alaska
North American 2000 m summits